The White House Internship Program is a government internship program that enables students and graduates to work at the White House.

Program overview

The White House Internship Program was unpaid until 2022, when President Joe Biden signed a bipartisan spending bill that set aside $4.5 million to pay White House interns. Interns must be U.S. citizens and at least 18 years of age, and must be either a current student, recent graduate, or veteran of the United States Armed Forces. Those selected for the program are able to work in one of sixteen available presidential departments.

The White House Internship Program is split into three semester seasons: summer, fall, and spring.

In addition to the opportunity to work in the Executive Office of the President, the White House Internship Program also includes a speaker series, tours to sites around Washington, D.C., opportunities to volunteer in the community, and attendance at special events.

Notable Former White House interns

Huma Abedin
Troy Blackwell
Julian Castro
Mimi Alford
Brent Barton
Jaime Herrera Beutler
Neil Cavuto
Ben Coes
Misha Collins
Rodney Mims Cook, Jr.
Rod Dembowski
Monique Dorsainvil
Anita Dunn
Deesha Dyer
Jim Ferrell
Trey Martinez Fischer
Andrew Leon Hanna

Michael H. Herson
David Hughes
Monica Lewinsky
Daniel Lorenzetti
Trip MacCracken
Roger Manno
Jaylin D. McClinton
Kayleigh McEnany
Thomas Ballard
Keiffer J. Mitchell, Jr.
Lisa Monaco
Lewis J. Paper
Tan Parker
Erik Prince
Richard Norton Smith
Michael Tubbs
Brian Williams
Tyrone Yates

See also
White House Fellows
Presidential Management Fellows Program
Presidential Innovation Fellows
United States Digital Service

References

External links
Official website

White House
Internship programs